Bexon is a village in Kent, England, situated North of the parishes of Frinsted and Bicknor, just south of the M2 motorway.

Bexon is also  the name of a community in South East Castries, St. Lucia.

Villages in Kent